(formerly tentatively known as the Toranomon-Azabudai District or Toranomon-Azabudai Project) is a complex of three skyscrapers under construction in Tokyo, Japan. Upon completion, the complex will contain the tallest building in Tokyo and Japan.

Designed by the architectural firm Pelli Clarke Pelli Architects and developed by the Mori Building Company, it is estimated that the project will cost about 580 billion yen. Construction started in 2019 and is expected to be completed in 2023.

The complex is located in the Toranomon business district, in the ward of Minato; it lays between sister Mori Building projects Roppongi Hills to the east and Toranomon Hills to the west. The project's official name, "Azabudai Hills", was announced by Mori Building on 14 December 2022.

Design 

The two accompanying buildings measure  in height. The three buildings were designed by Pelli Clarke Pelli Architects, the firm of Argentine architect César Pelli. Upon completion, the Azabudai Hills Mori JP Tower will be the tallest skyscraper in Tokyo, surpassing the nearby Toranomon Hills Station Tower, as well as in Japan, surpassing Osaka's Abeno Harukas.

Accompanying the skyscrapers are a series of low-rise buildings that plan to create a landscape pergola, designed by London-based Heatherwick Studio. The  area will be surrounded by lush greenery and will feature  of green space, including a  central square. According to Mori, the design embodies the concept of a “modern urban village". Additionally,  of cultural facilities will also be included.

Usage 
The main building contains office space in lower and middle floors, while residential spaces will be located on the upper floors, from the 56th floor to the 65th. It will also contain 4 lower floors, which will include a supermarket and a multi-language child care facility, as well as an international school, the British School in Tokyo. It is projected that the complex will house offices for about 20,000 workers and residences for about 3,500 people.

See also 
List of tallest structures in Japan
List of tallest structures in Tokyo

References

External links 

 

Skyscrapers in Tokyo
Redevelopment projects in Japan